Sinan Philipp Tekerci (born 22 September 1993) is a Turkish footballer who currently plays for SV Elversberg. He made his Bundesliga debut for 1. FC Nürnberg on 10 May 2014.

References

External links
 
 Sinan Tekerci at UEFA.com
 

1993 births
Living people
People from Freudenstadt
Sportspeople from Karlsruhe (region)
Turkish footballers
Turkey youth international footballers
German footballers
German people of Turkish descent
1. FC Nürnberg II players
1. FC Nürnberg players
Dynamo Dresden players
SC Preußen Münster players
FSV Zwickau players
Regionalliga players
Bundesliga players
3. Liga players
Association football midfielders
Footballers from Baden-Württemberg